Y2Kountry is a hits-oriented country radio channel on Sirius XM Radio 61 and Dish Network 605, which centers on the 2000s to mid-2010s (2000-2015). The channel is also available through the Sirius XM internet service, and through its app through iPad, iPhone and Android devices.

Trace Adkins hosts a weekend countdown called Throwback 30, counting down the 30 country hits of the 2000s, Buzz Brainard is a host in the mornings, called Mornings with Buzz and Danielle Peck has her own show on weekday drivetime.

Notable hosts
 Trace Adkins
 Buzz Brainard
 Danielle Peck

Core Artists
 Toby Keith
 Lady A
 Zac Brown Band
 Jason Aldean
 Brad Paisley
 Carrie Underwood
 Taylor Swift
 George Strait
 Brooks & Dunn
 Reba McEntire
 Keith Urban
 Tim McGraw
 Kenny Chesney
Luke Bryan

References

Sirius Satellite Radio channels
XM Satellite Radio channels
Country radio stations in the United States
2000s-themed radio stations
Radio stations established in 2014
Sirius XM Radio channels